Mongomo is a town in the province of Wele-Nzas on mainland Equatorial Guinea, on the eastern border, roughly 1 km (0.62 mi) west of Gabon's Woleu-Ntem Province.

Religion 
Its cathedral basilica of the Immaculate Conception is the episcopal see of the Roman Catholic Diocese of Mongomo.

Miscellenea 
Equatorial Guinea's first president Francisco Macías Nguema and the current President Teodoro Obiang Nguema Mbasogo were both born in Mongomo, hence the term clan of Mongomo to define those belonging to his ruling clique.

The city is home to Mongomo Provincial Hospital.

The Mongomo Hotel is located in Kos Ete, Mongomo.

Sports 
Mongomo's football club is Deportivo Mongomo, active in the Equatoguinean Premier League.

Mongomo was named a host city of the 2015 African Cup of Nations.

References

External links 

 
Populated places in Wele-Nzas
Equatorial Guinea–Gabon border crossings